Philip Bruns (May 2, 1931 – February 8, 2012) was an American television and movie actor and writer. He portrayed George Shumway, the father of Mary Hartman on the 1970s comedic series Mary Hartman, Mary Hartman, and Morty Seinfeld, the father of Jerry Seinfeld, in the 1990 second episode of Seinfeld.

Early life
Bruns was born on May 2, 1931 at a farm near Pipestone, Minnesota, the youngest of three children of Margie Evelyn Solon (née Trigg) and Henry Phillip Bruns. His ancestry was German and Irish. He played high school football.

He graduated with a Bachelor's Degree from Augustana College in South Dakota. He earned his Master's Degree from the Yale School of Drama in New Haven, Connecticut. He also studied at the Bristol Old Vic Theatre School in London, England.

Career
Bruns appeared in dozens of films, TV commercials, and on and Off-Broadway plays (winning an Obie Award for "Mr. Simian" in the 1963-64 season). He played the Warlock in Werner Liepolt's "The Young Master Dante" at The American Place Theater in 1968. He appeared for three seasons on The Jackie Gleason Show and played the father, George Shumway, on the 1970s comedic series Mary Hartman, Mary Hartman. He appeared as Morty Seinfeld in the sitcom Seinfeld, in a first-season episode entitled "The Stake Out", but was replaced in the role by Barney Martin after showrunners Larry David and Jerry Seinfeld decided they wanted the character of Morty Seinfeld to be harsher, as they thought Bruns was too laid-back for the role.

Films in which Bruns appeared include A Thousand Clowns (1965), Jenny (1970), The Out-of-Towners (1970), The Gang That Couldn't Shoot Straight (1971), Silent Night, Bloody Night (1972), Harry and Tonto (1974), The Great Waldo Pepper (1975), Nickelodeon (1976), Corvette Summer (1978), The Stunt Man (1980), My Favorite Year (1982), Flashdance (1983), Amazon Women on the Moon (1987), Return of the Living Dead Part II (1988), Dead Men Don't Die (1991), The Opposite Sex and How to Live with Them (1993), Love Bites (1993), Pentathlon (1994), The Trigger Effect, and Ed (1996). He wrote The Character Actor's Do's, Don't and Anecdotes''', which was published in early November 2008.

Personal life and death
Bruns married Jill Owens, a dancer on The Jackie Gleason Show, in 1969. Afterward, he married Laurie Franks, a Broadway star. He was lifetime friends with Peter O'Toole.

Until his death, Bruns resided in Hollywood with his wife, Laurie Franks (1929–2022). He died of natural causes at a hospital in Los Angeles on February 8, 2012.

Partial filmographyA Thousand Clowns (1965) - The Man in the RestaurantAll Woman (1967) - Drunken ManThe Swimmer (1968) - Biswangers' Pool Party Guest (uncredited)Midnight Cowboy (1969) - Man in TV Montage (uncredited)Jenny (1970) - FredThe Out-of-Towners (1970) - Officer MeyersTaking Off (1971) - PolicemanThe Gang That Couldn't Shoot Straight (1971) - GallagherSilent Night, Bloody Night (1972) - Wilfred Butler (1929)Harry and Tonto (1974) - BurtThe Great Waldo Pepper (1975) - DillhoeferFlash and the Firecat (1975) - Mr. WalleyNickelodeon (1976) - DuncanCorvette Summer (1978) - GilThe Stunt Man (1980) - AceMy Favorite Year (1982) - Fed. Marshal HoltFlashdance (1983) - Frank SzaboThe Christmas Star (1986) - LuckyAmazon Women on the Moon (1987) - French Ventriloquist Dummy - ManagerReturn of the Living Dead Part II (1988) - Doc MandelDead Men Don't Die (1990) - NolanThe Opposite Sex and How to Live with Them (1992) - Irv CrownLove Bites (1993) - Vinnie HelstingPentathlon (1994) - VicDigital Man (1995) - BobEd (1996) - ClarenceThe Trigger Effect (1996) - Mr. SchaeferJohnny Skidmarks (1998) - Old CootInferno'' (1999) - Old Man Buyer (final film role)

References

Sources
 Calvin, "Going Out of Business," Sanford and Son, NBC, 1974
 Calvin, "My Kingdom for a Horse" (also known as "First Night Out"), Sanford and Son, NBC, 1974

External links
 
 Philip Bruns;(Aveleyman)

1931 births
2012 deaths
People from Pipestone, Minnesota
Male actors from Minnesota
American male film actors
American male television actors
Yale School of Drama alumni
Augustana University alumni